Ecuador at the 1972 Summer Olympics in Munich, West Germany was the nation's second appearance by a national team under the auspices of the Ecuadorian National Olympic Committee representing Ecuador.

Results and competitors by event

Athletics
 Abdalá Bucaram - Did not start due to injury

Boxing
Men's Flyweight (– 51 kg)
 Jorge Mejía
 First Round — Lost to Douglas Rodríguez (CUB), 0:5

Swimming
 Jorge Delgado

References
Ecuador Olympic Committee
Official Olympic Reports
sports-reference

Nations at the 1972 Summer Olympics
1972 Summer Olympics
Olymp